RATF (Robustness Analysis and Technology Forecasting) is a software development methodology acting as a plug in to the Rational Unified Process (RUP), ICONIX, Extreme Programming (XP) and Agile software development. The first part of the method was first published by in 2005 at the IASTED International conference on Software Engineering.

RATF makes use of principles provided by the TRIZ innovation method and its techniques such as ARIZ and Technology forecasting, supported by Robustness analysis. The novel principle provided by RATF is to elaborate on potential software evolution in a method loop consisting of the steps:
 Extended Robustness Analysis - that investigates preliminary design options based on system expectations and system environment, thus identifying weaknesses in terms of system conflicts and likeliness for change.
 Technology Forecasting - which proposes likely, better and fruitful system design and evolution
 Extended Robustness Analysis - that investigates consequences of such evolution, identifying weaknesses and system conflicts
 Then the Technology Forecasting step is repeated, and so on.

Essentially the RATF method is expected to give improve decision for future system architecture and design, taking advantage of technology forecasting and innovation, thus "enabling design of tomorrow's system, today".

References 
 1.  & Calås, G. Makefors-Christierning, S. Boklund, A. (2005). A Case Study Evaluation of 11 Hypothetical Software System Evolution Laws included in the Proceedings of the IASTED International Conference on Software Engineering, 2005. ACTA press.

Related Concepts 
ICONIX
Rational Unified Process
TRIZ

Software development process
Software project management
Agile software development